Coat of arms of Republic of Latvia was officially adopted by the Constitutional Assembly of Latvia on 15 June 1921, and was in official use from 19 August 1921. It was created using new national symbols and elements of coats of arms of Polish and Swedish Livonia and of the Duchy of Courland and Semigallia. Thus the coat of arms combines symbols of Latvian national statehood, as well as symbols of its historical regions. The Latvian national coat of arms was designed by the Latvian artist Rihards Zariņš.

Elements
The three golden stars above the shield represent three historical regions of Latvia: Vidzeme (Swedish Livonia), Latgale (Latgalia or Polish Livonia) and Kurzeme (Courland, usually also representing Zemgale (Semigallia) as the Duchy of Courland and Semigalia) and their unity.

The golden sun in a blue field represents freedom. Sun was also used as a symbol of distinction and national identity used by the Imperial Russian Army's Latvian Riflemen units during World War I. During the war, the sun was fashioned with 17 rays that symbolised the 17 Latvian-inhabited districts. 

The bottom part of escutcheon is divided into two fields:
 The red lion from the Coat of arms of Courland represents Courland and Semigallia. The symbol appears as early as 1565 in the coat of arms of the former Duke of Courland and Semigalia.
 The silver griffin from the Coat of arms of Livonia represents Vidzeme and Latgalia. The Gryf coat of arms as the heraldic symbol of the Duchy of Livonia was granted in 1566, when the territories known today as Vidzeme and Latgale had come under the control of the Grand Duchy of Lithuania and Jan Hieronimowicz Chodkiewicz was made the first governor of Duchy of Livonia (1566–78).

The red lion and silver griffin are also used as supporters.

Base of the coat of arms is decorated with the branches of an oak tree, Quercus robur, which is one of Latvia's national symbols.

There is also a version with mantle existed, which is on display at the Saeima chamber in the House of the Livonian Noble Corporation.

Usage
The proper use of the Latvian coat of arms is firmly regulated. Three types of symbol are used: the large coat of arms, the small enhanced coat of arms and the small coat of arms.
 The Greater Coat of Arms is used by the President of Latvia, the Parliament, the Prime Minister, the Cabinet of Ministers, government ministries, the Supreme Court and Prosecutor General, as well as Latvian diplomatic and consular missions.
 The Small Enhanced Coat of Arms, (the Middle version) is used by Parliament agencies, the Cabinet of Ministers and other institutions under direct or indirect supervision of government ministries.
 The Small Coat of Arms is used by other government institutions, municipal authorities and educational institutions on official documents.

After the Soviet occupation of Latvia in 1940, the coat of arms was used until 5 August 1940. During the existence of the Latvian Soviet Socialist Republic the emblem of the Latvian Soviet Socialist Republic was used. The Latvian coat of arms was restored once again on 15 February 1990.

Colours
The official colours used in the coat of arms are defined according to the Pantone Colour Matching System thus:
 Red: Pantone 186 C
 Green: Pantone 340 C
 Blue: Pantone 286 C
 Yellow: Pantone 124 C
 Golden: Pantone 873 C
 Silver: Pantone 877 C
 Grey: Pantone 4 C
 Black: Pantone Black

Historical coats of arms

See also

 Flag of Latvia
 National anthem of Latvia
 Emblem of the Latvian Soviet Socialist Republic
 Freedom Monument (Riga)
 Coat of arms of Courland
 Coat of arms of Lithuania

References

External links
 The Coat of Arms   – basic info at the Latvijas institūts website

National symbols of Latvia
Latvia
1921 establishments in Latvia
 
Latvia
Latvia
Latvia
Latvia
Latvia
Latvia